Weste may refer to:

People
 Gretna Margaret Weste (1917–2006), Australian pathologist and mycologist
 Neil Weste (born 1951), Australian inventor and engineer

Places
 Weste, Lower Saxony, Germany

See also
 West